2021–22 Galatasaray SK Wheelchair Basketball Season is the 2021–2022 basketball season for Turkish professional basketball club Galatasaray.

Sponsorship and kit manufacturers

Supplier: Galatasaray Store
Main sponsor: Tunç Holding 
Back sponsor: —

Sleeve sponsor: —
Short sponsor: —
Socks sponsor: —

Team

Players

Depth chart

Squad changes

In

Out

|}

Staff and management

Competitions

Overview

Turkish Wheelchair Basketball Super League

League table

Results summary

Results by round

Matches

''Note: All times are TRT (UTC+3) as listed by the Turkish Physically Handicapped Sports Federation.

Playoffs

Quarterfinals

Semifinals

3–4th place

References

External links
 Galatasaray S.K. official website 

Galatasaray
Galatasaray Sports Club 2021–22 season
Galatasaray S.K. (wheelchair basketball) seasons